Neopentane, also called 2,2-dimethylpropane, is a double-branched-chain alkane with five carbon atoms.  Neopentane is a flammable gas at room temperature and pressure which can condense into a highly volatile liquid on a cold day, in an ice bath, or when compressed to a higher pressure.

Neopentane is the simplest alkane with a quaternary carbon, and has achiral tetrahedral symmetry.  It is one of the three structural isomers with the molecular formula C5H12 (pentanes), the other two being n-pentane and isopentane.  Out of these three, it is the only one to be a gas at standard conditions; the others are liquids.

Nomenclature
The traditional name neopentane was still retained in the 1993 IUPAC recommendations, but is no longer recommended according to the 2013 recommendations. The preferred IUPAC name is the systematic name 2,2-dimethylpropane, but the substituent numbers are superfluous because it is the only possible “dimethylpropane”.

A neopentyl substituent, often symbolized by "Np", has the structure Me3C–CH2– for instance neopentyl alcohol (Me3CCH2OH or NpOH). As Np also symbolises the element neptunium (atomic number 93) one should use this abbreviation with care.

The obsolete name tetramethylmethane is also used, especially in older sources.

Physical properties

Boiling and melting points
The boiling point of neopentane is only 9.5 °C, significantly lower than those of isopentane (27.7 °C) and normal pentane (36.0 °C).  Therefore, neopentane is a gas at room temperature and atmospheric pressure, while the other two isomers are (barely) liquids.

The melting point of neopentane (−16.6 °C), on the other hand, is 140 degrees higher than that of isopentane (−159.9 °C) and 110 degrees higher than that of n-pentane (−129.8 °C). This anomaly has been attributed to the better solid-state packing assumed to be possible with the tetrahedral neopentane molecule; but this explanation has been challenged on account of it having a lower density than the other two isomers. Moreover, its enthalpy of fusion is lower than the enthalpies of fusion of both n-pentane and isopentane, thus indicating that its high melting point is due to an entropy effect resulting from higher molecular symmetry. Indeed, the entropy of fusion of neopentane is about four times lower than that of n-pentane and isopentane.

1H NMR spectrum
Because of neopentane's full tetrahedral symmetry, all protons are chemically equivalent, leading to a single NMR chemical shift δ = 0.902 when dissolved in carbon tetrachloride. In this respect, neopentane is similar to its silane analog, tetramethylsilane, whose single chemical shift is zero by convention.

The symmetry of the neopentane molecule can be broken if some hydrogen atoms are replaced by deuterium atoms.  In particular, if each methyl group has a different number of substituted atoms (0, 1, 2, and 3), one obtains a chiral molecule. The chirality in this case arises solely by the mass distribution of its nuclei, while the electron distribution is still essentially achiral.

References

External links

IUPAC Nomenclature of Organic Chemistry (online version of the "Blue Book")

Alkanes